Khosrowshirin is a village situated in the northern stretches of Fars Province near the southern borders of Isfahan. The village enjoys a cold climate and the average rainfall in the area is about 400 millimeters per year.

People
The population of the village is estimated to be 2500 and during the warm season reaches 3000 or 3500. The nomads from southern parts of the Fars Province migrate to Khosrowshirin to spend the summer.

Language
People of this village have a very simple Persian accent which is almost similar to Lori Dialect. The accent of the people is so simple that even a total stranger to the village can perfectly understand people and communicate with them.

Learn more about the village on www.khosroushirin.blogfa.com

Populated places in Fars Province